Winchester is an unincorporated community in Macon County, in the U.S. state of Georgia.

History
A post office called Winchester was established in 1851, and remained in operation until 1935. The community's name most likely is a transfer from Winchester, in England.

References

Unincorporated communities in Georgia (U.S. state)
Unincorporated communities in Macon County, Georgia